Sonic Underground (French: Sonic Le Rebelle) is an animated television series co-produced by DIC Productions, L.P., Les Studios Tex S.A.R.L. and TF1. It is the third Sonic the Hedgehog animated series, and the last to be produced by DIC. It follows a main plot separate from all other Sonic the Hedgehog media, where Sonic has two siblings, Sonia and Manic, that are collectively part of a royal family who were forced to separate from their mother, Queen Aleena, upon Doctor Robotnik's takeover of Mobius due to a prophecy told by the Oracle of Delphius. Along the way, they encounter other resistance groups against Robotnik as well as powerful artifacts that could wreak havoc on the world, all the while searching for their long-lost mother Queen Aleena.

The series first aired in France from January to May 1999 on TF1, and then premiered in the United Kingdom in May 1999 on ITV on the GMTV strand and finally in the United States in the syndicated children's block BKN Kids II from August to October 1999. It also aired on Kids' WB and the Sci-Fi Channel on weekday mornings starting October 1999, lasting until October 2000. The show ran only for one season consisting of forty episodes. It was the first Sonic the Hedgehog television series to be sold on the iTunes Store.

Plot

The show takes place in a separate canon and continuity than any other Sonic the Hedgehog media. Queen Aleena, the former ruler of Mobius, was overthrown by Dr. Robotnik and his bounty hunter lackeys Sleet and Dingo. Robotnik seized control of the planet and forced Queen Aleena into hiding. To preserve the dynasty, Queen Aleena separated her three children: Sonic, Manic, and Sonia after the Oracle of Delphius told her of a prophecy, proclaiming that one day, Queen Aleena would reunite with her children to form the "Council of Four," and overthrow Robotnik. Meanwhile, Dr. Robotnik did his best to set up an autocratic government, and legally turned anyone who stood against him into robots devoid of free will, and forced the nobles into paying large amounts of money to him as tribute.

When Sonic, Manic, and Sonia grew up, the Oracle of Delphius revealed the prophecy to them. After that, Sonic, Manic, and Sonia decided to go on a quest, searching throughout Mobius for Queen Aleena. Dr. Robotnik, with the assistance of the Swat-Bots and his bounty hunters Sleet and Dingo, tries constantly to capture the royal hedgehogs and prevent the prophecy from being fulfilled.

The Oracle of Delphius has assigned the three siblings powerful "medallions" that can change into musical instruments, and can also be used as weapons. Sonic's medallion is an electric guitar, Sonia's medallion is a keyboard that functions as a smoke machine, and Manic's medallion is a drumset that can be used as an "earth controller" with cymbals that can deflect laserfire. All of the medallions can be used as laser guns. The three use the amulets not only to fight Robotnik's forces but also as instruments for their underground rock band, "Sonic Underground."

Characters

Main
 

 Sonic (voiced by Jaleel White,) is the eldest sibling and lead singer of many songs performed by the Sonic Underground. His medallion turns into a guitar, which can fire laser blasts. As fast as the speed of sound, Sonic can easily outrun danger. He is a big fan of chili dogs, causing him to be a bit overweight. He also has hydrophobia, being terrified of water as he cannot swim. Sonic wears anti-gravity sneakers that allow him to hover over the ground while running. His singing voice is provided by Sam Vincent.
 Sonia (also voiced by Jaleel White) is the only female hedgehog member of the Sonic Underground and the sister of Sonic and Manic. Unlike her brothers, she was raised by an aristocratic foster family, giving her an upper class mentality. She hates getting dirty, is skilled at gymnastics and karate, and possesses superhuman strength, a photographic memory, and the ability to spin in a cyclonic manner. Her medallion turns into a keyboard, which can fire laser blasts from one end, or create a pink mist when the keys are played. Sonia has a pink motorcycle which can travel as fast as Sonic's running and Manic's hover board (it was destroyed in the 36th episode). She also is the one that does research on Robotnik's plans and provides the technological innovation for the Sonic Underground. Of the siblings, Sonia is the only one to be seen involved in any romance, displaying feelings for her childhood friend Bartleby, despite his snobbishness, as well as other men encountered in her travels. Among these is Knuckles the Echidna, whom she develops an attraction to during the series' Flying Fortress saga. Her singing voice is provided by Stevie Vallance.
 Manic (also voiced by Jaleel White) is the youngest sibling. He is a calculating and sarcastic hedgehog that was raised by thieves, and is a master of their trade. When Manic met his siblings, they disapproved of his thieving tendencies, but his skills as a lock-pick were greatly appreciated. Manic possesses neither Sonic's speed nor Sonia's spin-attack, thus making him the only member of the Sonic Underground who relies on entirely on his medallion for superpowers of his own. Despite his lack of superpowers, his thieving skills proves himself extremely useful to the group from time to time. Manic is the drummer of the Sonic Underground. His medallion turns into drums, which can cause earthquakes; the Oracle of Delphius claims that his drums are the most powerful instruments of the three. He also has a hover board that is as fast as Sonic's running and Sonia's motorcycle. His medallion's string is blue. His singing voice is provided by Tyley Ross.
 Dr. Robotnik (voiced by Garry Chalk) is the evil dictator of Mobius, renamed Robotropolis under his rule, having conquered it with his army of Swatbots. He captures and roboticizes anyone who opposes him, transforming them into robotic servants.
 Sleet (voiced by Maurice LaMarche) is one of Robotnik's canine bounty hunters. This cunning wolf leads the bumbling Dingo about on missions to capture the hedgehogs. Sleet has a morphing device that can transform Dingo into anything he wishes. He is constantly being crushed by Dingo and is usually the one who suffers the most from their combined failures.
 Dingo (voiced by Peter Wilds) is one of Robotnik's canine bounty hunters and Sleet's partner. Dingo is a huge, muscle-bound blonde dingo and is also very ignorant. He is partially roboticized in his hands and his left leg from the knee down, which is never explained. He has a relentless crush on Sonia, but remains fiercely loyal to Sleet.
 Swatbots (voiced by Maurice LaMarche) are the robotic foot soldiers of Dr. Robotnik.

Recurring
 Queen Aleena Hedgehog (voiced by Gail Webster) is the mother of the Sonic Underground group and former ruler of Mobius before Robotnik's takeover. She had to give them up in order for the prophecy to become true. She spends the series on the run from her own children, until the time is right to reveal herself. Her character has many allies, including the Oracle of Delphius and Knuckles. She also does a bit of narrating in the start of every episode.
 Knuckles (voiced by Brian Drummond) is a red echidna who is the guardian of one of the Chaos Emeralds and Angel Island, and an acquaintance of Queen Aleena's. He is very protective of his island home, and has set many traps about the island. He has a pet dinosaur called Chomps, and like his game incarnation is shown to be somewhat gullible. His great-grandfather Athair warns him that he must stay on the island in order to play his part in the freedom of Mobius. He turned against the Hedgehogs twice - first being tricked into thinking they were thieves and later thinking that it was the only way to save their planet - but came around and worked with them against the threat of Robotnik and his henchmen. During the Flying Fortress arc, he showed signs of a growing affection for Sonia, including a particular guilt over the prospect of betraying her.
 Oracle of Delphius (voiced by Maurice LaMarche) is an odd, wart-covered in a cloak that resembles a scaly anteater. The Oracle prophesied that when Robotnik invaded Mobius, Aleena and her children would form the Council of Four to overthrow Robotnik and free Mobius. The Oracle lives in a cave somewhere in a cold region of Mobius, and is quite good at making chili dogs. He is named after the Oracle at Delphi.
 Sir Bartleby Montclair is a posh, cowardly mink who is one of Robotropolis' richest aristocrats. Bartleby was Sonia's fiancé. He dislikes Dr. Robotnik and is often forced to fund Robotnik's schemes – although in secret he still supports Aleena. He speaks with an upper-class English accent.
 Cyrus (voiced by Ian James Corlett) is a lion and a technician for the Freedom Fighters. He is an old friend of Sonic. In his first appearance he was working as a spy for Robotnik, but quit upon discovering that the Freedom Fighters' Sanctuary was a hideout for their children. Cyrus's father was roboticized.
 Trevor is a mouse who is a friend of the royal siblings and Cyrus. He dresses like a hippie. Trevor is an ace pilot and helps build and fix mechanical equipment.

Episodes

History

Development

It is often claimed that the newly Sega of America CEO Shoichiro Irimajiri contacted DIC CEO Andy Heyward to make a new Sonic cartoon, which would help gain interest in buying their new console, the Dreamcast. Sonic Underground started production in early 1997, around the same time the development of both the Dreamcast and Sonic Adventure had started. The show bible was written as early as March 1997. The show was publicly announced as early as December 1997.

When the show was in development, two episodes per week were produced, and the writers felt that they were not given enough time to "tie everything together" in the plot, being limited to a three-part "Origins" saga for coherency. DIC used cattle calls to generate episode plots. Periodically, about twenty unaffiliated writers were brought into the studios to learn about the established characters and brainstorm possible plots for episodes, after which about one or two would be selected. According to Mike Piccirillo, when he was writing songs for the show, there were no storyboards done yet, so he could only work off of the scripts, which often said what moral or lesson the song should be about in each episode. The show's animation was outsourced to the Taiwanese animation studio Hong Ying Animation with the main title animation done in Madrid, Spain by Milimetros, S.A. (also responsible for the animation in the Saturday morning Sonic the Hedgehog cartoon), pre-production services provided by Le Studio Ellipse, layout services by Arles Animation and video and audio post-production services by Les Studios de Saint-Ouen. According to Robby London, Sega of Japan had an active role in the approval process for Sonic Underground, going so far as to force DiC to reanimate the characters with five fingers instead of the usual four due to the Japanese association of four fingers with the Yakuza.

While it was once believed that 65 episodes were made of which only 40 aired, Ben Hurst, a main writer from Sonic the Hedgehog (dubbed SatAM by fans), who was also involved in Sonic Underground'''s production, stated in a chat at the Sonic Amateur Games Expo 2008 that only 40 were planned to be produced from the beginning.

Airing and Broadcast
FranceSonic Underground first premiered in France on 6 January 1999 and aired on TF1 on the TF! Jeunesse block on Wednesdays and Sundays.

United Kingdom
The show made its English premiere in the United Kingdom on May 2, 1999, airing on ITV's GMTV strand, on the Disney-produced block Diggit, which was programmed by the show's distributor Buena Vista International Television and had also aired other programmes produced by DIC Entertainment at the time. ITV aired the first 18 episodes of the series on Sunday mornings before the series was removed from the Diggit schedule.

In 2005, DIC pre-sold the series to GMTV, and so the series reran on ITV2 in 2005 as part of the GMTV2 Kids strand.

By 2006, alongside the other Sonic cartoons, the series began to air on Pop, and by 2012, was airing on its sister channel Kix!

North America
In January 1999, it was announced that Bohbot Entertainment had acquired the North American broadcast rights to the series to air on their BKN syndicated strand. The series premiered in the country on August 30 1999 on the company's then-new BKN Kids II on weekday mornings at 6:00 AM Central Time., and ran until  October 22 1999.

The series also aired on the Sci-Fi Channel which BKN also had a broadcast deal with at the time, however, the episodes that were supposed to air on Fridays were skipped because Double Dragon and later King Arthur and the Knights of Justice were airing instead, therefore only 32 of the 40 Sonic Underground episodes aired on that channel.

In 2004, the show returned to syndicated television stations on weekends as part of the DIC Kids Network E/I strand. It, alongside fellow DIC series Mummies Alive! were the only two programs on the strand to not fulfill E/I requirements.

On January 19 2006, CBS announced a multi-year deal with DIC to broadcast some of their shows on the "CBS's Secret Saturday Morning Slumber Party" segment, including Sonic Underground, however, the block would not end up running the show in the end.

In 2009, reruns of Sonic Underground aired on Firestone Communications' Sorpresa, a Hispanic children's station (Channel 850 on Time Warner Cable) in the United States, broadcasting the audio-dubbed Latin Spanish dub.

Re-runs of the series aired on Disney XD starting June 11 2012 and ending on December 14 2012. This marked the second time a Sonic the Hedgehog cartoon has aired on a Disney-themed channel, with the first being Adventures of Sonic the Hedgehog on Toon Disney (the predecessor of Disney XD)  from 1998 to 2002.

The series aired in Canada on Teletoon.

Other regions
In Australia, Sonic Underground premiered on The Seven Network during The Big Breakfast in 1999.

The show was broadcast by KidsCo in regions the channel broadcast from.

Home media
United States
In the United States, Sterling Entertainment released a VHS/DVD titled "Dr. Robotnik's Revenge" in July 2003, containing three episodes, and a bonus Super Mario Bros. episode on the DVD release. It was re-released by NCircle Entertainment in March 2007 without the bonus Mario episode. The Sterling versions of the Adventures of Super Mario Bros. 3 "King Koopa Katastrophe" and The Legend of Zelda "Ganon's Evil Tower" DVDs also included 1 and 2 episodes respectively as DVD bonuses which the NCircle reissues of both releases excluded. Sterling Entertainment's VHS/DVD release of Sonic Christmas Blast also included 3 episodes (2 on the VHS).

Shout! Factory and Vivendi Entertainment have released the complete series on DVD in Region 1 (NTSC) in two volume sets. Volume 1, simply entitled Sonic Underground, was released on December 18, 2007. It contains the first 20 episodes of the show on three discs, with disc three also including interviews with DIC's Robby London, Mike Piccirillo, an opening title animatic, and concept art. A bonus fourth disc is an audio CD containing eight songs from the series, including the opening theme. Sonic Underground: Volume 2 was released on 17 June 2008, featuring the remaining 20 episodes and another bonus audio CD featuring eight more songs from the series.

From 2007 until 2010, NCircle Entertainment released several single-release DVDs containing four episodes each:

The compilation release "Sonic Mega Mix", released on January 4, 2011, includes the episodes "Underground Masquerade" and "Sonic Tonic".

In May 2013 NCircle Entertainment re-released the first Shout! Factory boxset of the series, and later re-released Volume 2 in May 2017.

, Sonic Underground is available on the iTunes Store.

United Kingdom
In 2004, Anchor Bay UK obtained rights to distribute several DIC cartoons, including Sonic Underground on home video. The first two volumes were released on May 31, 2004https://web.archive.org/web/20040817010803/http://www.anchorbay.co.uk/perl/search.pl?CO=ABD4316 while the next two were released on August 16, 2004.https://web.archive.org/web/20040908073553/http://www.anchorbay.co.uk/perl/search.pl?CO=ABD4318 There were plans for the remaining six volumes to be released separately, but they were instead released in a 10-DVD boxset in October 2004.

In July 2005, Avenue Entertainment released two budget DVDs containing two episodes each.

Delta Home Entertainment released the complete series again on DVD in June 2008 as a 4-disc set, with the fifth DVD containing the bonus features from the Shout! Factory DVD boxset. Delta Home Entertainment also released the four discs separately, with Disc 1 and 2 being released as "Beginnings" and "Who Do You Think You Are" in August 2008, and Discs 3 and 4 being released as "When in Rome" and "Country Crisis" in September 2008.

ReceptionSonic Underground received mixed to negative reviews: it was criticized for its complex plot and large amount of differences from the games, although some critics have defined the music as catchy. David Cornelius of DVD Talk said, "While many Sonic fans did not take too well to all the changes, preferring the original 'Sonic' cartoon to this stranger, sometimes darker, sometimes sillier incarnation, the series did win a small but loyal cult following. I fall more on the side of disappointment - for all the cleverness that went into crafting an all-new backstory, the episodes themselves are uninspired - but acknowledge the simple fact that it scores well with its target audience." GamesRadar called the show as one of "the absolute worst Sonic moments", criticizing the extra characters and the complex plot. Patrick Lee of The A.V. Club panned the series, calling it one of the most artistic failures to ever end up on television and "the result of several unrelated ideas forcibly squashed into one project". Comedian Chris Hardwick commented on the show's theme song, composed by Mike Piccirillo, claiming that "that guy sounds like he's trying to win his exwife back." Susan Arendt of Wired said "The songs are actually kind of catchy in a Saturday morning cartoon kind of way, but the band thing still seems a bit out of place, especially when the instruments turn into weapons." Emily Ashby of Common Sense Media said "Sonic Underground has some good things to offer kids, but only if they're ready for the complexities of its story" criticizing its complex plot but complimenting its low violence and ability to entertain children.

Other media
The Sonic the Hedgehog comic from Archie Comics featured a story in one of its special issues in which the Sonic Underground continuity was featured. According to the comics' plot, the reality in which Sonic Underground takes place is one of many parallel universes that share elements with Sonic's own. In the story, Sonic Prime—hailing from the main universe in the comic series—joins forces with his counterpart and siblings to stop Dr. Robotnik, who has managed to assemble a monstrous battle machine known as the Giant Borg. Robotnik obtained the pieces for this machine due to being mistaken for one of his own counterparts by Evil Sonic, an evil counterpart of Sonic's who later came to be known as Scourge the Hedgehog.

The Sonic Universe spin-off comic was originally scheduled to feature an epilogue to the unfinished Sonic Underground'' for its 50th issue. However, for unknown reasons this was replaced with a story focusing on one of Sonic's long-running enemies, Metal Sonic. The Underground Epilogue was put on hold indefinitely, due to Sega not permitting the show be featured in the comics.

References

External links

 at DHX Media

1990s American animated television series
1990s American comic science fiction television series
1990s French animated television series
1999 American television series debuts
1999 American television series endings
1999 French television series debuts
1999 French television series endings
American children's animated action television series
American children's animated adventure television series
American children's animated comic science fiction television series
American children's animated science fantasy television series
American children's animated musical television series
Animated musical groups
Animated series based on Sonic the Hedgehog
Animated television series about hedgehogs
Animated television series about siblings
Fictional musical groups
First-run syndicated television programs in the United States
French children's animated action television series
French children's animated adventure television series
French children's animated comic science fiction television series
French children's animated science fantasy television series
French children's animated musical television series
Television series by DIC Entertainment
French-language television shows
English-language television shows